The Portsmouth Street Tramways Company operated horse tramways in Portsmouth, England. It was started under the terms of a Provisional Order of 1874 and was a wholly owned subsidiary company of The Provincial Tramways Company.

Route Development
The first route in 1874 ran from Broad Street in Old Portsmouth via the town centre to North End with a depot at each end of the route. The trams from North End depot were yellow while those from the Broad Street depot were green. Further routes were developed during the following years authorised by the passing of Parliamentary Acts and Orders of 1876, 1877, 1879, 1881, 1883, 1887, and 1896. In 1878 two rival companies, the Landport and Southsea Tramways Company and the General Tramways Company of Portsmouth were purchased. this allowed the Portsmouth Street Tramways Company to become the dominant tram operator in Portsmouth.

In 1883 the three tramway companies in Portsmouth together with the Gosport Street Tramways Company were all amalgamated into the Portsmouth Street Tramways Company. This resulted in the Portsmouth Street Tramways Company  becoming the dominant tram operator in Portsmouth during the next 17 years. Route extensions continued and in 1881 a new tramway was opened from North End to Cosham and this was the first route to extend beyond the town boundary, although the company had an existing horse bus route to Cosham.

Andrew's Buses
As part of the long running trading war between the horse buses of Solomon Andrews in Cardiff and the Provincial trams in Cardiff the Andrew's buses were also deployed in Plymouth and Portsmouth to compete with Provincial in its other towns. When this conflict, which started in 1872, was  resolved in 1887 the horse bus operations of Solomon Andrews were purchased by Provincial and those in Portsmouth were merged with the horse bus routes operated by the Portsmouth Street Tramways Company.

Municipilisation
By 1892 the horse tram network had reached a maximum size of 14 miles of tramway operated by 58 tramcars and 249 horses, each individual route had its own distinguishing colour of car. Most of the route mileage was single track with passing loops and only a limited amount of double track in the town centre. In 1895 Portsmouth Corporation started to talk about taking over and electrifying the tramways and after several years of negotiations and disputes the Corporation purchased all of the horse tram network commencing from 1 January 1901. This included the tramway to Cosham which at that time was outside of the town boundaries. The purchase price had to be settled by arbitration at £185,633 which was unfortunate for the company because they had declined an offer from the Corporation of £205,964. The Portsmouth Street Tramways Company was left with its other businesses of horse bus operations and wedding cars and funeral hearses and also the horse tramways in Gosport.

Subsequent to the loss of their tram operation in Portsmouth The Provincial Tramways Company constructed and opened the Portsdown and Horndean Light Railway from Cosham northwards to Horndean but this was under a new company and not the Portsmouth Street Tramways Company.

Gosport and Fareham
The horse tram routes in Gosport ran from the Portsmouth ferry terminal via Forton Road to Brockhurst with another line running via Stoke Road to Bury Cross. This operation started as a separate company in 1882 but was merged into the Portsmouth Street Tramways Company in 1883. After surviving an attempted takeover by Gosport and Alverstoke Council the company went on to reconstruct and electrify the tramways and extend the Brockhurst branch to Fareham Railway Station in 1905. This tramway continued to operate until closure in 1929 when it was replaced by motor bus routes, in the same year the Portsmouth Street Tramways Company was renamed to the Gosport and Fareham Omnibus Company.

The Gosport and Fareham Omnibus Company was acquired by the National Bus Company in 1970 but as a statutory company under the 1929 act it retained its identity and continued operating buses in Gosport and Fareham until 1983 when its operations were taken over by a new company, the Provincial Bus Company, and thereafter  the Gosport and Fareham Omnibus Company remained as a non-trading dormant company until it was dissolved in 1987 by an act of parliament.

References

Plymouth
Companies based in Portsmouth